Jonathan Sean Lowe (born March 29, 1971) is a former pitcher in Major League Baseball who played from 1997 through 2003 for the St. Louis Cardinals, Chicago White Sox, Pittsburgh Pirates, Colorado Rockies and Kansas City Royals. 

Lowe attended Mesquite High School in Mesquite, Texas, where he graduated in 1989.

Lowe was drafted by the Cardinals in the first round (15th pick) of the 1992 Major League Baseball Draft. Lowe finished his seven-year MLB career with a 23-15 record, a 4.95 ERA and 288 strikeouts. He was primarily used in middle relief during his career. 

Lowe's unique spot in baseball immortality occurred on 16 June 2001, against the St. Louis Cardinals, when Albert Pujols recorded his first, and what may yet be his only, sacrifice bunt against Lowe.

Sources

External links
, or Retrosheet, or Pelota Binaria (Venezuelan Winter League)

1971 births
Living people
Arizona State Sun Devils baseball players
Arkansas Travelers players
Baseball players from Dallas
Charlotte Knights players
Chicago White Sox players
Colorado Rockies players
Hamilton Redbirds players
Kansas City Royals players
Louisville Redbirds players
Major League Baseball pitchers
McLennan Highlanders baseball players
Memphis Redbirds players
Mesquite High School (Texas) alumni
Nashville Sounds players
Navegantes del Magallanes players
American expatriate baseball players in Venezuela
Omaha Royals players
Pittsburgh Pirates players
St. Louis Cardinals players
St. Petersburg Cardinals players